The 1994 Detroit Lions season was the 65th season in the National Football League (NFL). The Lions finished with a 9–7 record and made their second consecutive playoff appearance as one of the NFC's Wildcard teams -- the first time the franchise had made the playoffs in consecutive non-strike seasons since 1954.

Despite the signing of Scott Mitchell from Miami in the offseason, it was former Seattle quarterback Dave Krieg who led the Lions into the playoffs following an injury to Mitchell. For the second consecutive year, the Lions lost in the playoffs to the Green Bay Packers.

Offseason

NFL Draft 

Free Agency: They signed Scott Mitchell, who had just had ok year in Miami replacing Dan Marino, who missed the year with an Injury

Personnel

Staff

Roster

Regular season

Schedule 

Note: Intra-division opponents are in bold text.

Game summaries

Week 1 vs. Atlanta Falcons 
The Lions opened the 1994 season by hosting the Falcons, who were no longer with the services of defensive back Deion Sanders, now with San Francisco. Scott Mitchell and Jeff George erupted in the second half, combining for six touchdowns as the game lead tied or changed six times. In overtime the Lions drove down for Jason Hanson's winning field goal and a 31-28 final.

Week 2 at Minnesota Vikings 
Defense was the story as the two teams combined for just 501 yards of offense, four fumbles, two interceptions, 147 yards of penalties, and a 10-3 Vikings win.

Week 3 at Dallas Cowboys 

    
    
    
    
    
    
    

Barry Sanders accounted for 194 of the Lions' 379 total yards of offense, while the Cowboys fumbled away the ball three times.

Week 4 vs. New England Patriots 
Two Scott Mitchell interceptions proved decisive as the Patriots held on to win 23-17, despite 131 yards and two scores by Barry Sanders, highlighted when he outmaneuvered Harlon Barnett and Myron Guyton on one score; the NFL Films slow-motion clip of the score is the most replayed highlight in retrospectives on Sanders' career.

Week 5 at Tampa Bay Buccaneers 
Scott Mitchell and Derrick Moore rushing touchdowns were the only offense the Lions could generate as the Bucs held on to a 24-14 win.

Week 6 vs. San Francisco 49ers 
The Lions suffered their third straight loss despite racing to a 14-0 lead; they sacked Steve Young and Young, suffering a pinched nerve, writhed in pain, his face turning red. He managed to limp to the sidelines; Elvis Grbac came in for one play (an incomplete pass) before Young recovered enough to come back in and lead the Niners to four touchdown drives (marred by a missed PAT) for the 27-21 Niners win.

Week 8 vs. Chicago Bears 
Despite giving up 400 yards of offense (and giving up two fumbles and a pick) and managing just 232 of their own (167 of them from Barry Sanders), the Lions intercepted Erik Kramer three times and Mel Gray's 102-yard kickoff return was decisive in a 21-16 Lions win.

Week 9 at New York Giants 
After the Lions forced a safety in the first quarter, the game lead tied or changed five times as Barry Sanders rushed for 146 yards and caught two passes for 22 yards. Scott Mitchell was intercepted three times but managed two touchdowns, the last to Herman Moore in the fourth quarter. Dave Meggett's 56-yard punt return and Aaron Pierce's seven-yard catch in the fourth forced overtime, won 28-25 by the Lions on a 24-yard kick by Jason Hanson.

Week 10 at Green Bay Packers 
The Lions fumbled three times and Scott Mitchell was benched after throwing two picks; Dave Krieg threw three touchdowns but the Lions could not overcome a 24-0 gap, falling 38-30.

Week 11 vs. Tampa Bay Buccaneers 
Barry Sanders exploded to 237 rushing yards as the Lions held the Bucs to three field goals, winning 14-9.

Week 12 at Chicago Bears 
The Lions scored 10 points in the second quarter but that was all they could muster as the Bears outgained them in yards 338-180 and scored ten second-half points to win 20-10.

Week 13 Thanksgiving vs. Buffalo Bills 
Dave Krieg started and the Lions passing attack erupted to 351 yards and three touchdowns. The Bills fell behind 21-7 but clawed to within 28-21 in the fourth quarter, but Jim Kelly was intercepted by Willie Clay and Clay ran back the 28-yard touchdown that clinched the win for the Lions 35-21. Barry Sanders managed only 45 rushing yards and one touchdown. A glorious Thanksgiving Day for the Lions.

Week 14 vs. Green Bay Packers 
The Lions and Packers squared off in a highly competitive contest as the game lead tied once and changed six times following the first quarter and a 14-3 Packers lead. Barry Sanders broke out 188 rushing yards and a touchdown while Dave Krieg managed 196 passing yards and two touchdowns. Brett Favre had three touchdowns but was picked off twice as the Lions rallied to win 34-31.

Week 15 at New York Jets 
The post-November collapse of the 1994 Jets continued as Jason Hanson booted four field goals yet missed the PAT on a Barry Sanders touchdown catch. The Jets managed just 261 yards of offense and a Brad Baxter touchdown as the Lions won 18-7.

Week 16 vs. Minnesota Vikings 
The four-way showdown for the NFC Central title took another twist as the Lions crushed the Vikings 41-19. The Lions needed only 284 yards of offense as Barry Sanders accounted for two touchdowns and Dave Krieg added a pair of scoring tosses. Warren Moon managed one touchdown and one pick and was replaced by Brad Johnson, but it couldn't help the Vikings overcome ten penalties for 98 yards.

Week 17 Christmas at Miami Dolphins 
On Sunday Night Football both teams were locked in neck-and-neck divisional races; with the Patriots beating the Bears and the Packers downing the Buccaneers the day before, and the Vikings to face the 49ers on Monday Night, both teams had motive to win. It would not happen for the Lions as Dave Krieg was intercepted twice and Barry Sanders was held to 52 yards. Bernie Parmalee had 39 rushing yards and three touchdowns as the Dolphins won 27-20, winning the AFC East while the Lions made the playoffs as the NFC's fifth seed.

Standings

Playoffs

NFC Wild Card Game: At Green Bay Packers 

The Packers defense held Lions running back Barry Sanders to −1 rushing yards while holding Brett Perriman to −4 rushing yards. The Lions managed just 171 total yards of offense, with 199 yards passing from Dave Krieg, but he was sacked 4 times, resulting in 28 yards loss.

Awards and honors 
 Barry Sanders, All-Pro
 Barry Sanders, NFC Pro Bowl Selection
 Barry Sanders, NFL Offensive Player of the Year
 Barry Sanders, Club Record, Most Rushing Yards in One Game, 237 yards, November 13.

Milestones 
 Barry Sanders, 6th consecutive 1000 yard season

References

External links 
 1994 Detroit Lions at Pro-Football-Reference.com

Detroit
Detroit Lions seasons
Detroit Lions